Ramrod 16 was an attempt by the Royal Air Force (RAF) to bomb the Koninklijke Hoogovens (Royal Blast Furnaces) steelworks at IJmuiden in the Netherlands during the Second World War. After several recent abortive attacks a more elaborate plan was made for six Douglas Boston IIIA light bombers of 107 Squadron to attack again, with a Ramrod as a diversion. (Ramrod was the RAF term for bomber operations intended to induce  fighters into action for British fighter escorts to attack.) Ramrod 16 was to be flown by twelve Lockheed Ventura Mk II bombers of No. 487 Squadron RNZAF against the Hemweg power station in Amsterdam, not far upriver from IJmuiden.

Thirteen Spitfire squadrons from 11 Group, Fighter Command, were to fly Rodeo 212 to Vlissingen (Flushing),  to the south-west of Amsterdam, as another diversion. The Venturas were to be escorted by three squadrons of Spitfires from 12 Group, Fighter Command. Two squadrons of high-flying Spitfire Mk IXs were to wait off the Dutch coast, available for contingencies and eight Mustang fighters were to protect the Bostons on their return from IJmuiden, three more Spitfire squadrons covering the return of the Venturas.

The raid began in the late afternoon of 3 May 1943 but Rodeo 212 arrived early and at height, alerting the Germans. The first three 107 Squadron Bostons missed the IJmuiden steelworks but the second formation obtained direct hits. The Venturas of 487 Squadron got ahead of most of their escort and met an unexpectedly large number of German fighters, the local contingent having, by coincidence, having been temporarily been reinforced. All but one of the Venturas were shot down before bombing and a German Messerschmitt Bf 109 fighter was shot down by the last Ventura, flown by Squadron Leader Leonard Trent, whose bombs overshot the power station; Trent was shot down moments later.

Morale of the three Ventura squadrons in 2 Group was severely shaken by the losses but 487 Squadron was rebuilt, returned to operations at the end of the month and was re-equipped with de Havilland Mosquitos later in the year. The full story of the raid became known when Trent was repatriated from a German prison camp in 1945. Trent was awarded a Victoria Cross and his navigator, Flight Lieutenant Vivian Phillips, received a Distinguished Service Order.

Background

Bomber Command, 1939

On 4 September 1939, five out of ten Bristol Blenheim bombers were shot down making low-level attacks on German warships in daylight, along with two out of fourteen Vickers Wellington bombers. On 29 September, five Handley-Page Hampden bombers flew another raid against German warships and all were shot down. Few operations were possible in October and November due to weather but on 3 December, 24 Wellingtons were sent to attack German ships. The Wellingtons were intercepted by German Messerschmitt Bf 109 and Messerschmitt Bf 110 fighters and engaged by German anti-aircraft guns; no bombers were lost and one Bf 109 was claimed shot down, later confirmed by German records. On 14 December, Wellingtons made another attack and five were shot down, another crashing in England. Flying at higher altitude and taking a longer route to avoid neutral territory, the Wellingtons were easier to detect by German radar. Around 100 German fighters were scrambled to intercept the bombers and the Wellingtons were intercepted by cannon-armed Bf 110s and machine-gun armed Bf 109Ds. In what became known as the Battle of the Heligoland Bight, eleven Wellingtons were shot down, one ditched in the North Sea and six crashed in England. Only one group of Wellingtons had bombed, the other had refrained to avoid civilian casualties; the Germans lost three fighters to return fire.

The extent of the loss "stunned" RAF leaders, exploding their belief that tight formations of bombers, equipped with machine-gun turrets, could defeat attack by day fighters. From January 1940, the Wellington and Hampden day bombers joined the specialist Armstrong-Whitworth Whitley night bombers in flying leaflet-dropping missions over Germany. The Fairey Battle and Blenheim light day bombers of the Advanced Air Striking Force in France and 2 Group in England also devoted considerable time to night-flying training. During the Battle of France the AASF and 2 Group flew day and night sorties, the Battles of the AASF suffering losses of 75 per cent by day from 10 to 14 May and 0.5 per cent by night. During the battle, the AASF lost 137 Battles and 37 Blenheims; 2 Group lost 98 Blenheims.

Leaning forward into France

The policy was known as "Leaning forward into France" and begun by Air Chief Marshal Sholto Douglas, who had replaced Hugh Dowding as Air Officer Commanding in chief Fighter Command on 25 November 1940. From December 1940, 11 Group flew Rhubarbs, raids by two or three fighters attacking targets of opportunity; Rodeos, fighter sweeps over enemy territory without bombers, which the  usually ignored and Circuses, small numbers of bombers from 2 Group, escorted by large numbers of fighters. The objective of the operations was to attack ground targets, destroy any  fighters which opposed the raids and keep them in Western Europe. Ramrods were bomber sorties escorted by fighters, primarily  intended to destroy a ground target and inflict losses by the escorts on German fighters trying to intervene.

From December 1940 to June 1941, Fighter Command flew 104 Rhubarbs and eleven Circuses. In Bomber Command only 2 Group still flew day bombers and Operation Barbarossa, the German invasion of the Soviet Union, beginning on 22 June, gave the group added significance. The  withdrew its squadrons from coastal airfields to bases further inland, from where they could decline combat or engage RAF fighters in places where the British fighters were at a tactical disadvantage for lack of fuel. The effort was a failure, no German fighters being transferred from the USSR to reinforce the two  (fighter groups) in the west. The Fighter Command loss was 51 pilots by June 1941 but another 411 were lost by years' end, a greater loss than July to October 1940.

Fighter Command made "enormously exaggerated estimates of German losses", from June to the end of December 1941 claiming 731  aircraft against a real  loss of 154 aircraft, 51 of which were not lost to RAF action. By late January 1942,  transfers of day fighters and anti-aircraft units had been identified by the British and Ultra decryption of German signals coded with the Enigma machine uncovered the transfer of 30 of the newest German fighter type to the Russian front and 40 from the Pas de Calais to northern Norway for anti-convoy operations.

By mid-June, Fighter Command had suffered 259 losses for the loss of 58 German fighters, against Fighter Command claims to have destroyed 197. The offensive continued at a lesser rate, to tie down Fw 190 units and to maintain a measure of air superiority along the Channel coast, until the maximum effort during the Dieppe Raid (19 August 1942). In 2 Group, obsolete Blenheim bombers began to be replaced by faster and more versatile Douglas Boston, Lockheed Ventura and de Havilland Mosquito day bombers.

Prelude

2 Group raids

The three squadrons of 2 Group equipped with Douglas Bostons began replacing their aircraft with new Boston Mk IIIAs in March 1943, flying training sorties and sea search operations. The first squadron to resume offensive operations was 107 Squadron on 1 May; Caen was attacked but the raid was thwarted by cloud cover. On 2 May, 107 Squadron attacked the Koninklijke Hoogovens (Royal Blast Furnaces) steelworks at IJmuiden on the coast, missed the works but hit barges and dock installations nearby. Spitfire Mk IXe fighters of 331 (Norwegian) Squadron claimed three Focke Wulf Fw 190 fighters. The Venturas of No. 464 Squadron RAAF (Royal Australian Air Force) also attacked the steel works, escorted by the Spitfire Vbs of 118 Squadron. The bombers flew the usual wave top height approach over the North Sea then made a battle climb (a fast climb to bombing height). The Venturas received moderate  as they attacked, also missed the steelworks but hit the coking works, sulphate plant and other ancillary works, along with three ships, two of which sank. The Venturas were caught  out on the return journey by Fw 190s, which damaged two of the bombers for two Fw 190s claimed shot down by the escorts.

Plan

Ramrod 16 was another attempt on the IJmuiden steelworks by six Boston IIIAs with a diversion provided by twelve Ventura Mk II bombers of  No. 487 Squadron RNZAF on 3 May. In bright blue skies, sunshine and a warm day, the fourteen crews of 487 Squadron were briefed for the raid at RAF Methwold their base in Norfolk. Twelve aircraft were to fly on the operation with three Spitfire squadrons as close escort. The Ventura crews were told to expect determined opposition but to press on at all costs. B Flight, 487 Squadron, led by its commander, Squadron Leader Leonard Trent and the deputy flight commander, Flight Lieutenant A. V. Duffill, was to be followed by A Flight, the result of a coin toss with the A Flight commander, Squadron Leader Jack Meakin. The plan was to bomb at dusk for the Venturas to benefit from the declining visibility and return under cover of the dark.

The Spitfire Mark IX had a performance similar to that of the  Messersmitt Bf 109G and Focke Wulf 190A fighters but only ten Fighter Command squadrons had been equipped with it by mid-1943, due to shortage of engines and despatches to overseas squadrons. Most domestic Spitfire squadrons were left flying obsolete Mk Vs, restricted to close escort of bombers. Fighter Command operations to protect bombers consisted of target support (or forward support) a sweep by fighter squadrons kept available for contingencies, close escort with the bombers, high cover for the close escort and rear support to escort the bombers home and engage any German fighters when the other escorts were low on fuel and ammunition.

Target support was to be provided by the Supermarine Spitfire Mk IXbs of 122 Squadron and No. 453 Squadron RAAF flying a sweep along the coast west of the Ventura approach route. Thirteen fighter squadrons from 11 Group were to fly Rodeo 212 towards Vlissingen (Flushing) on the island of Walcheren to the south-west as a diversion.

Raid

The eleven remaining Venturas rendezvoused a few minutes later with the Spitfire escorts of the Coltishall Wing over RAF Coltishall nearer the coast. The Bostons of 464 Squadron also set off from Coltishall, flying much lower than the Venturas. Trent led the first six Venturas in a tight box formation, with the second group, led by Meakin, following. Thirteen fighter squadrons from 11 Group flying Rodeo 212 got their timing wrong and arrived at Vlissingen,  to the south-west of Amsterdam, thirty minutes early, appearing on German radar and alerting the German fighter units.

A  conference was scheduled for that day at Schiphol airfield near Amsterdam and a great number of experienced fighter pilots were in attendance from other parts of the Western Front. Bf 109 fighters and Fw 190 fighters intercepted the first vic as it re-crossed the coast but the evasive action of the Bostons enabled them to escape without loss. The second vic, attacking through intense  released their bombs and hit the steel works, turned for home and ran into the German fighters, which shot down BZ227, the Boston flown by Flight Sergeant F. S. Harrop in flames; the other two Bostons escaped, noting a Ventura coming down in the water, apparently lost with all hands.

When the bombers reached  the target was visible ahead in the clear sky. As a precaution against a possible British attack on Seyss-Inquart, the German fighters were ordered off the ground and climbed at about the same time as the Venturas. The German fighters included 24 Fw 190 fighters from II. (2nd Group) of Jagdgeschwader 1 (JG 1, 1st Fighter Wing) and eight Bf 109 fighters from 2. (2nd Squadron) of Jagdgeschwader 27 (JG 27, 27th Fighter Wing).

Over the coast more than twenty German fighters from the three  of  fell on 504 and 167 squadrons of the close escort as thirty more headed for the Venturas. The Spitfires of 504 Squadron were still climbing when Fw 190s swept overhead and cut them off from the Venturas. The commander of the Coltishall Wing, Wing Commander Howard "Cowboy" Blatchford, tried to warn the bombers but they had already been surrounded by German fighters. A dog-fight began with Fw 190s diving on 167 Squadron; 504 Squadron, still climbing in the rear, did a 360° turn to lure the Fw 190s to no avail; 118 Squadron got as far as the west end of Amsterdam and was credited with two Fw 190s, 167 Squadron another.

The Ventura flown by Duffill was one of the first to be hit; cannon-fire destroyed the hydraulics, set both engines alight and seriously wounded the two gunners, after one had claimed a fighter. Duffill turned for home, followed by two A Flight Venturas, which were quickly shot down. Attacked by German fighters until well out over the North Sea, Duffill managed to keep the Ventura airborne and the navigator jettisoned the bombs. The fires died down and Duffill reached Methwold to land safely (the gunners were rushed to Ely Hospital and the crew was awarded immediate decorations). Within minutes of crossing the coast the Venturas were reduced to five aircraft; Flying Officer O. E. Foster was the pilot of one of the five aircraft left to begin the bomb run.

Foster saw the two Venturas in front of his aircraft explode and moments later his Ventura was hit and the bomb doors fell off, followed by the bombs. Foster turned for home and his Ventura was hit by anti-aircraft fire, which knocked out the starboard engine. Foster dived to avoid the German fighters but the ammunition containers for his forward-firing guns began to explode and blew the nose off. The navigator, Flying Officer T. A. Penn, was badly wounded and the rear gunner, Flight-Sergeant T. W. J. Warner was mortally wounded but got forward to report that his turret was out of action before he died. Foster managed to pull the Ventura out of a dive towards a harbour, only to find that he was in the middle of a German convoy. Foster cleared the ships but his controls were damaged and he could barely keep the Ventura in the air as he re-crossed the Dutch coast. The Ventura was leaking fuel and Foster ordered ditching stations; the port engine failed and the Ventura crashed into the sea and quickly sank. Foster, Penn and the wireless operator Sergeant R. W. Mann struggled out of the submerged aircraft. One of the crew recounted,

The German patrol boat picked up the three survivors a couple of hours after the crash.

One of the German fighters overshot the Venturas and crossed in front Trent, giving him a chance to fire at it with his fixed twin  nose guns. The Messerschmitt was caught by the short burst and was seen to go down in flames. Trent later said he was surprised the German pilots would pursue them through such heavy . Pressing on to the target, Trent released his bombs and turned for home but as he did so his aircraft was hit again, went into a sharp spin and broke apart. Trent and his navigator, Flight Lieutenant Vivian Phillips, were thrown clear of the wreckage in mid-air and pulled their parachute ripcords but the other two crew members were unable to get free and died when the Ventura crashed into Kometon Polder; Trent and his navigator survived and were taken prisoner. Between  and  JG 1 claimed ten aircraft and  Max Winkler from 2./JG 27 claimed a Ventura shot down north of Amsterdam, for three II./JG 1 Fw 190s shot down and two pilots killed.

Aftermath

Analysis
The 487 Squadron roll was called on 6 May and mustered only six crews and eight aircraft; it was the fourth time that a squadron had been almost annihilated in one operation. Morale in 464 Squadron, another Ventura squadron, was as severely affected as that of 487 Squadron by the losses, especially since the squadron to go on the operation had been decided by the toss of a coin.

Casualties
Of the twelve 487 Squadron Venturas sent on the mission, the only survivors were the crew of the aircraft from the first box which had turned back with a damaged escape hatch (it broke free when the Ventura landed and jammed in the rudder) and Duffill's aircraft from the second box, which was damaged beyond repair and written off; few aircrew in the nine Venturas shot down on their approach to the target survived. Some hope was offered by fighter pilots on Ramrod 16 who had reported seeing seven parachutes. The 487 Squadron diarist recorded,

A wounded air gunner, Flight Sergeant Urlich, was pushed out of his burning aircraft by his pilot, Flying Officer McGowan and the navigator, Flying Officer Thornber, who were killed soon afterwards, when the bomber exploded.

Urlich wrote later,

 Ernst Heesen from 5./JG 1 and  Willi Pfeiffer from 4./JG 1 were killed in action. Heesen had been credited with 32 aerial victories and was the leading fighter pilot in II./JG 1.  Georg Hutter was also shot down, and made a forced landing at Haarlem, the aircraft being written off. Heesen may have been shot down by Sergeant R. J. Flight from 118 Squadron.

Subsequent operations

The attack on the Ijmuiden steel works by 107 Squadron was followed up by Circuses to Abbeville, Cherbourg and Poix. En route for home, between Poix and Le Touquet, the Bostons were attacked by Bf 109s and Fw 190s. The fighters escorting the Bostons claimed two Bf 109s and Flight Sergeant Kindle, rear gunner of the squadron CO, R. G. England, claimed two fighters damaged. One Boston landed at RAF Detling with a punctured fuel tank and another came down in a field near East Peckham in Kent.

Squadron Leader Alan Wilson took command 487 Squadron which was re-built to a complement of 21 crews; on 23 May the squadron attacked coking ovens at Zeebrugge against scant opposition. On 28 May the King, George VI, came to RAF Methwold to pay his respects and meet fourteen crews from each squadron on the base. A few days later Sir Archibald Sinclair, the Secretary of State for Air, paid a visit to inspect the re-building; 464 Squadron bombed Carpiquet airfield near Caen on the same day. At the end of May, 2 Group left Bomber Command to join the new Second Tactical Air Force and came under Fighter Command control until the formation of the Allied Expeditionary Air Force, five months later. In August 487 Squadron converted to the de Havilland Mosquito; the squadron joined the new 140 Wing and went on to participate in the Amiens prison raid (Operation Jericho).

Leonard Trent

After his capture, Trent took part in the mass escape by tunnel from Stalag Luft III in Sagan, Lower Silesia in Germany, in March 1944. During the preparations for what became known as the Great Escape. Trent was one of the men responsible for disposal of sand taken from the tunnel; Trent also acted as a security officer to prevent the Germans learning of what was afoot. During the escape, Trent passed through the tunnel and emerged from the hole outside the camp wire when a patrolling sentry discovered the men waiting to crawl away into the woods and alerted the camp guards. After being repatriated and returning to 487 Squadron, Trent reported,

Awards
For their actions on Ramrod 16, Trent was awarded a Victoria Cross at an investiture at Buckingham Palace on 12 April 1946 and Phillips was decorated with the Distinguished Service Order (DSO). Following the war Trent spent a short amount of time in the New Zealand Air Force before returning to the RAF, where he completed his career, reaching the rank of Group Captain.

Order of battle

487 Squadron
 AJ209 V; Squadron Leader L. H. Trent's aircraft, crashed into Kominten Polder near Fokker Works,  two killed, two taken prisoner (PoW)
 AE916 C; aircraft returned damaged, landed RAF Feltwell at 
 AE731 O; emergency landing between Haarlem and Vijfhuizen  three crew killed, one PoW
 AE684 B; shot down over Bennebroek , one killed, three POW
 AJ200 G; shot down at Vijfhuizen, no survivors
 AE780 S; shot down at Bornstrasse, Amsterdam; three killed, one PoW
 AE716 U; crashed in polder west of Amsterdam  no survivors
 AE713 T; crashed at Hernbrug , no survivors
 AE956 H; lost at sea, no survivors
 AE798 D; lost at sea, no survivors
 Q Queenie;  turned back, crew survived

107 Squadron
 Boston IIIA × 6

Rodeo 212
 Thirteen 11 Group fighter squadrons flying a diversion to Vlissingen (Flushing) on the island of Walcheren,  to the south-west of Amsterdam.

Target Support
 122 Squadron (5 × Spitfire Mk IX)
 No. 453 Squadron RAAF (11 × Spitfire Mk IX)

Close escort
 118 Squadron (12 × Spitfire Mk V) 
 167 Squadron (8 × Spitfire Mk Vb, 4 × Spitfire Vc)
 504 (County of Nottingham) Squadron (3 × Spitfire Mk Vb, 9 × Spitfire MkVc)

Rear cover
 302 (Polish) Squadron (7 × Spitfire Mk V) 
 306 (Polish) Squadron (12 × Spitfire Mk V)
 308 (Polish) Squadron (11 × Spitfire Mk V) 
 613 (City of Manchester) Squadron (8 × Mustang Mk I)

See also
 Circus offensive
 Operation Oyster
 Operation Jericho

Notes

Footnotes

Bibliography

Further reading

 
 
 
 

Ramrod 16
Ramrod 16
History of the Royal Air Force during World War II
Ramrod 16
Conflicts in 1943
May 1943 events